The Housing Authority of the City of Los Angeles (HACLA) is a state-chartered public agency. Established in 1938, HACLA provides the largest stock of affordable housing in the city Los Angeles, California and is one of the nation's oldest public housing authorities.

Its funds come from five main sources: United States Department of Housing and Urban Development's annual operating subsidy, HUD's annual Capital Fund, Section 8 administrative fees, rent from public housing residents, and other program and capital grants from various sources.

Circa 1992, there were a total of 32,257 public housing units in Los Angeles.

History
In July 1983,  Mayor Tom Bradley disbanded the housing authority commission following allegations of mismanagement both by internal sources and by the Los Angeles Times. The City Council took control. After months of dispute, including former commissioners rallying housing project residents to support them, the new commission took control the following January with reduced powers.

Housing locations
The larger location sites are:

 Avalon Gardens
 Estrada Courts
 Gonzaque Village
 Imperial Courts
 Jordan Downs
 Mar Vista Gardens
 Nickerson Gardens
 Pico/Aliso Gardens
 Pueblo Del Rio
 Ramona Gardens
 Rancho San Pedro
 Rose Hills Courts
 San Fernando Gardens
 William Mead Homes
 Dana Strand Village
 Pueblo del Sol
 Normont Terrace/Harbor Village

Nickerson Gardens is the largest family large public housing development in Los Angeles with 1,066 units.

References

External links

 

Public housing in Los Angeles
Government agencies established in 1938
1938 establishments in California
Welfare in California